Turkey! is an upcoming original Japanese anime television series about bowling animated by Bakken Record and produced by Pony Canyon, set in the city of Chikuma, Nagano. It is written by Naomi Hiruta, with Airi Takekawa serving as character designer, and Pony Canyon producing the music.

References

External links
  
 

Anime with original screenplays
Bowling in anime and manga
Chikuma, Nagano
Pony Canyon
Tatsunoko Production
Television shows set in Nagano Prefecture
Upcoming anime television series